David Ian Salter is an American film editor whose credits include Toy Story 2 (1999), Finding Nemo (2003), Ice Age: Continental Drift (2012), The SpongeBob Movie: Sponge Out of Water (2015), The Addams Family (2019), and Under the Boardwalk.

Salter has been elected to membership of the American Cinema Editors and the Academy of Motion Picture Arts and Sciences.

Filmography

As an editor

References

External links 

 

American Cinema Editors
Living people
American film editors
Pixar people
Blue Sky Studios people
Year of birth missing (living people)